Eliyathamby Ratnasabapathy (November 3, 1938 – December 12, 2006) was one of the founder member of the Eelam Revolutionary Organization of Students a Tamil militant group from Sri Lanka and a noted Marxist-Leninist political leader.

Biography and political career
He was born in a small town called Inuvil in the Jaffna peninsula in the minority Sri Lankan Tamil dominated north of Sri Lanka. He migrated to the United Kingdom when Sri Lanka was in the midst of its early stages of its ethnic conflict.

Eelam Revolutionary Organization of Students (EROS) was founded on January 3, 1975, at Wandsworth, London, in the residence of Eliyathamby Ratnasabapathy. It was led by a unified command of three persons: Ratnasabapathy, Shankar Rajee and Velupillai Balakumar. EROS through its contacts with PLO sent many people including one Arul Pragasam who became a leader of EROS to be trained in guerilla tactics in Lebanon.

It was later alleged that it was George Habash's PFLP not the PLO that trained the early batch of Tamil militants from Sri Lanka. He contested the parliamentary elections in 1989 and was elected to the Sri Lankan Parliament along with nine other members of EROS, but later resigned.

Reactions
In a tribute to Mr. Ratnasabapathy, the Tamil Information Center (TIC) in London said:

See also
Sri Lankan civil war
Human Rights in Sri Lanka
State terrorism in Sri Lanka
Black July pogrom

References

MIPT terrorism database
SRI LANKA: THE UNTOLD STORY Chapter 30: Whirlpool of violence 
EROS founder dies By Tamilnet.com

1938 births
2006 deaths
Eelam Revolutionary Organisation of Students militants
Eelam Revolutionary Organisation of Students politicians
Members of the 9th Parliament of Sri Lanka
Sri Lankan Tamil politicians
Sri Lankan Tamil rebels
Sri Lankan Hindus
English people of Sri Lankan Tamil descent